The Sulitsa (Sölçä) is a river in Tatarstan, Russian Federation, a right-bank tributary of the Sviyaga.
Major tributaries are the Changara, Mamatkozino, and Klyancheyka. Drainage is regulated. Since 1978 it has been protected as a natural monument of Tatarstan.

References 

Rivers of Tatarstan